The Opel Mokka is a subcompact crossover SUV that has been produced by German automaker Opel since 2012. Sales began with the model year of 2013, at the end of 2012. The first generation was developed by GM Korea as the U200 Chevrolet Trax. Between 2016 and 2019, the Opel Mokka was renamed the Mokka X. It is also sold under the Vauxhall brand in the United Kingdom. The Buick Encore sold in North America and in China was also derived from the Trax but the lines diverged after Opel became part of Stellantis.

The second generation Mokka was launched in 2020 after a brief hiatus. It marked the switch to PSA platform, after the acquisition of Opel and Vauxhall brands in 2017. It was renamed back to Mokka, ditching the 'X' suffix.



First generation (J13; 2012) 

The Mokka was positioned below the Antara and the Zafira Tourer in the Opel line-up, and was available in both front wheel and four wheel drive versions. The Mokka name derives from the small, round coffee beans of the Coffea Arabica variety. The Mokka is based on GM's Gamma II platform.

The four wheel drive option was an intelligent AWD system that maintains 100% drive at the front wheels until the system detects slip, fast starts or tight cornering, in which case it can send up to 50% of torque to the rear wheels.

Production and sales started in autumn of 2012. By February 2013, Opel had over 80,000 Mokka orders, and after two months 100,000 orders. By October 2014, over 300,000 Mokkas were ordered in Europe. In January 2016, Opel announced 500,000 firm orders for Mokka overall.

In 2019, Opel ceased production of the first generation Mokka as part of Opel/Vauxhall's full switch to Groupe PSA car platforms. The vehicle is still sold under the Buick marque.

The Mokka (and Encore) are derived from the Chevrolet/Holden Trax, but are given their own sheet metal and trim.

Facelift 
In April 2016, Opel and Vauxhall unveiled an updated version of the Mokka for the model year of 2017, designated as the Mokka X, which went on sale in the end of 2016. The new Mokka X sports a facelift with sleeker headlights, restyled bumpers, new LED tail lights, and a revised interior with an all new dash, instrument cluster, and center stack. The more powerful optional  petrol engine was also introduced with the Mokka X.

Mokka by Bitter 
Bitter has been producing a luxury version of the Mokka since 2016. Facelifted in the end of 2016 along with the Vauxhall and Opel models, the name was also changed to Mokka X. The differences between the Bitter and Opel versions are mainly cosmetic.

Engines 
As introduced in 2012, the Mokka was offered with a choice of three engines: a  1.6-litre petrol, a  1.4-litre turbo petrol, and a  1.7-litre diesel.

Other petrol and diesel engines were offered later, including a  1.4-litre direct injection turbo petrol engine with a controversial start/stop feature introduced for model year 2016.

Most engines are paired standard with the 5-speed (1.6-litre MPI petrol engine only) or 6-speed manual transmission, with stop/start engine technology beginning as early as model year 2014. A six speed automatic transmission having active select mode is optionally available for select petrol and diesel engines including the 1.4-litre MPI Turbo petrol and 1.7-litre CDTI diesel engines for both FWD and AWD models.

Start/Stop technology on vehicles with automatic transmissions first appeared with the introduction of the new, more powerful (112 kW; 150 hp), B14XFT 1.4-litre direct injection (DI) VVT Turbo petrol engine for model year 2016 and was incorporated on other select petrol and diesel engines paired with automatic transmissions by model year 2018.

In the market in Russia, a version with a 1.8-litre A18XER (Korean designation F18DA) petrol engine is available. The cars for the Russian market were assembled by Avtotor (Kaliningrad, Russia) and later by Unison (Minsk, Belarus) in 2015. In October 2014, for the model year of 2015, Opel introduced its all new "whisper diesel" 1.6-litre CDTI engine which replaced the 1.7-litre CDTI diesel. The engine specifications in the following tables is from the 2013, 2015, and 2018 Opel owner manual.

Engine code prefix B indicates Start/Stop technology. B14NET is also available for LPG.

Second generation (2020) 

The second-generation Mokka was announced in August 2018 by the show car Opel GT X Experimental concept, and unveiled in 24 June 2020. Now based on the ex-PSA Group's Common Modular Platform (CMP), the car is available with an electric version dubbed as the Mokka-e.

The ICE version was unveiled in 2 September 2020. Sales of the second-generation Mokka began with the model year of 2021, on 23 December 2020.

Safety

Euro NCAP
The Mokka in its standard European configuration received 4 stars from Euro NCAP in 2021.

Mokka-e 
The Mokka-e, the all-electric version of the Mokka, is powered by a 50kWh lithium-ion battery with a WLTP range of 201 miles. Three driving modes are available, Sport, Eco and Normal.

Awards 
In June 2022, the Mokka-e won Auto Trader UK's New Car Award for the Erin Baker Award. Auto Trader awarded the Mokka-e four stars out of five in its review of the car.

Sales

References

External links 

 

Mokka
Front-wheel-drive vehicles
All-wheel-drive vehicles
Mini sport utility vehicles
Crossover sport utility vehicles
Euro NCAP small off-road
Cars introduced in 2012
Cars of Germany
Production electric cars